Houghs Creek (Hough Creek) is a tributary of the Delaware River in Bucks County, Pennsylvania, contained wholly within Upper Makefield Township.

History
Houghs Creek is named for the first settler on the creek, Richard Hough. It is shown on the Homes map of 1682-1684 as flowing through the Hough tract, but his name was spelled as 'Richard Huffe'.

Statistics
Houghs Creek was added to the Geographic Names Information System database of the U.S. Geological Survey as identification number 1192637 on 2 August 1979. The Pennsylvania Gazatteer of Stream identifies Houghs Creek as number 02958.

Course

Municipalities
Bucks County
Upper Makefield Township

Crossings and bridges

See also
List of rivers of Pennsylvania
List of rivers of the United States
List of Delaware River tributaries

References

Rivers of Bucks County, Pennsylvania
Rivers of Pennsylvania
Tributaries of the Delaware River